Hansa may refer to:

Places
Hanseatic League, a 13th–17th century alliance of European trading cities
Hansa (shopping centre), in Turku, Finland
Hansa-Park, a German attraction park
480 Hansa, a main-belt asteroid, a minor planet orbiting the Sun

Transportation

Ships
 Hansa, a schooner, the research ship of the Second German North Polar Expedition
 , a container ship, the recovery of whose lost cargo of uniquely numbered Nike shoes provided research into North Pacific Ocean currents
 , a German auxiliary cruiser used in World War II
 , a German Imperial navy ship name
 , a German armored corvette
 , a German protected cruiser
 , several steamships of the name
 , a German transatlantic passenger liner renamed Hansa in 1935 because Ballin had been Jewish
 , a Swedish passenger liner, sunk by a Soviet submarine in 1944

Others
Hansa (airship), or Zeppelin LZ13, a German airship
Hansa (car), a German car brand of the Borgward group
HFB 320 Hansa Jet, a German business jet
Hansa Bai, 15th century Queen of Mewar

Organizations
Hansa Brewery, a Norwegian brewery merged to form Hansa Borg Bryggerier
Hansa Records, a record label based in Germany
Hansa Tonstudio, a recording studio in Berlin, Germany
Hansa Rostock, a German football (soccer) club
Lufthansa, a German airline company
Lüneburger SK Hansa, a German football (soccer) club
DDG Hansa, a former German shipping company
Hansa (market), a former darknet market
Hansa Chippers, a woodchipper manufacturer based in New Zealand

Other uses
Hansa, a synonym for Metrocles (skipper), a genus of butterflies
Hansa (film), a 2012 Hindi film directed by Manav Kaul
Hansa Bird, or Hamsa, a swan or goose used as a symbol and decorative element in India
Hansa Session, a 2018 album by Scottish synth-pop band Chvrches.
Hansa Yellow, a yellow pigment used in paints
Hansa, an Earth-based trade organization that governs much of human civilization in Kevin J. Anderson's The Saga of Seven Suns science fiction series
Hansa Parekh, a character in the Khichdi franchise

See also 

 Khansa (disambiguation)
 Hamsa (disambiguation)